The Skabilly Rebels, usually billed as "Roddy Radiation & The Skabilly Rebels", are an English band formed in 2003 by Roddy Radiation, formerly of The Specials, and Sam Smith, who had previously worked together in rockabilly band The Bonediggers. The band is based in Coventry, England. Their songs, all written by Radiation, are a hybrid of ska and rockabilly music styles.

They released their debut album Blues Attack in 2009 and toured the United States in 2012. A follow-up EP, "Fallen Angels", was released in 2016.

Members
 Roddy Radiation - Vocals, Lead Guitar
 Joey Harcourt - Guitar/Vocals
 Father Adie H Dee - Saxophone/ EWI 
 Connor O'Connor - Bass guitar
 Mat Hart - Drums

Former members
 Lee Pratt - Drums/vocals 
 Danny Webb - Rhythm guitarist/Backing vocals
 Iain 'H' Howard - Rhythm guitarist
 Paul Raggity - Drums
 Spencer Walker - Drums
 Paul Ayriss - Drums
 Terry Downes - Drums
 Jez Edwards - Keyboards
 Jay Jones - Keyboards
 Sam Smith - Bass guitar/Double Bass/Rhythm Guitar
 Dave Gedney - Rhythm Guitar

Bibliography
 Duff Guide to Ska - 22 August 2011 "Interview: Roddy "Radiation" Byers of The Skabilly Rebels & The Specials"

References

External links
 Official Roddy Radiation website

English ska musical groups
Musical groups from Coventry
English rock music groups
Rockabilly music groups